Arlington Municipal Airport  is a public airport located one mile (2 km) northeast of the central business district of Arlington, in Gilliam County, Oregon, United States. It is owned by the City of Arlington.

Facilities and aircraft 
For the 12-month period ending July 20, 2005, the airport had 1,010 aircraft operations: 99% general aviation and 1% air taxi.

Insitu uses the airport as a testing location for one of their UAVs.

References

External links 

Airports in Gilliam County, Oregon